"Pogledom te skidam" ("Undressing You with My Eyes") is a song recorded by Serbian recording artist Bojan Bjelić featuring pop star Dara Bubamara. It was released 27 May 2012 and was featured as a bonus track on his third studio album Prva rezerva, released by City Records 6 December 2013. The song was written by Miloš Roganović and Filip Miletić. It was produced and recorded in Belgrade.

The music video was directed by Ivan Code and premiered the same day as the song.

References

External links
Pogledom te skidam at Discogs

2012 singles
2012 songs
Serbian songs